Harold L. Kahn (November 15, 1930December 11, 2018) was an American historian. He was a professor of Chinese History at Stanford University, and the author of a book about Imperial China.

Early life
Kahn was born on November 15, 1930 in Poughkeepsie, New York. He graduated from Williams College, and he earned a PhD in History from Harvard University.

Career
Kahn began his career as a History professor at the SOAS, University of London. He taught Chinese History at Stanford University from 1968 to 1998. The Kahn-Van Slyke Award for Graduate Mentorship and the Harold Kahn Reading Room at Stanford University were named in his honor. Kahn authored a book about Imperial China.

Kahn was opposed to United States involvement in the Vietnam War.

Death
Kahn died on December 11, 2018, in San Francisco.

Selected works

References

1930 births
2018 deaths
20th-century American historians
20th-century American male writers
21st-century American historians
21st-century American male writers
Academics of SOAS University of London
American anti–Vietnam War activists
American male non-fiction writers
Harvard University alumni
Historians from California
Historians from New York (state)
People from Poughkeepsie, New York
People from San Francisco
Stanford University faculty
Williams College alumni